Kiichi (written: , , , , ,  or ) is a masculine Japanese given name. Notable people with the name include:

, Japanese politician
, Japanese equestrian
, Imperial Japanese Navy admiral
, Japanese politician
, Japanese mixed martial artist
, Japanese educator
, Japanese botanist
, Japanese politician and Prime Minister of Japan
, Japanese actor
, Japanese World War II flying ace
, Japanese painter and illustrator
, Japanese footballer
, Japanese footballer
, Japanese swimmer
Matthew Kiichi Heafy (born 1986), Japanese-born American musician

See also
Kiichi!!, a Japanese manga series

Japanese masculine given names